The Avatar: The Last Airbender comics are an official continuation of the original Nickelodeon animated television series, Avatar: The Last Airbender, created by Michael Dante DiMartino and Bryan Konietzko. The series includes The Lost Adventures, published from 2005 to 2011 and set between episodes of the original series, and the graphic novel trilogies, published since 2012 and set a few years after the original series. A related comic continuation, taking place seven decades later, The Legend of Korra, began publication in 2017.

Short stories

Free Comic Book Day issues 
Since 2011, there have been six short comics of Avatar: The Last Airbender or The Legend of Korra at Free Comic Book Day offerings from Dark Horse Comics.

The Lost Adventures 
The Avatar: The Last Airbender – The Lost Adventures graphic novel is a collection of long-out-of-print, fan-favorite comics previously published in Nickelodeon Magazine and the Avatar: The Last Airbender DVD collections between 2005 and 2011. It also includes the Free Comic Book Day issue "Relics" and all-new comics. Published 15 June 2011, it is an anthology that includes twenty-eight stories by various writers and artists, many of whom worked on the original animated series.

Team Avatar Tales 
Avatar: The Last Airbender – Team Avatar Tales is the second anthology book, collecting the 2013–2015 Free Comic Book Day stories along with all-new stories. The book was released on 2 October 2019. Creators include Gene Luen Yang, Dave Scheidt, Sara Goetter, Ron Koertge, Kiku Hughes, Faith Erin Hicks, Ryan Hill, Carla Speed McNeil, Little Corvus, and Coni Yovaniniz.

Graphic novels 
Dark Horse Comics published a series of graphic novels that serve as a continuation of Avatar: The Last Airbender television series. It consists of trilogies and stand-alone graphic novels. The first five stories are written by Gene Luen Yang and drawn by artist team Gurihiru. In December 2018, Faith Erin Hicks took over as writer with Peter Wartman as artist.

Collections 
The stories are collected in oversized hardcover library edition featuring notes from the creators and a sketchbook section. They are also collected in paperback omnibuses, printed at digest size.

The Promise

Plot 
The Promise is the first comic to continue right after the show ended on Nickelodeon and picks up right after what the series left off. For example, in the last episode of the series, Katara and Aang start their relationship and The Promise Part One explores their new romance. The comic also explores Toph's metal bending practices and Zuko's reign as Fire Lord. The audience sees more of the dynamic between Avatar Aang and Fire Lord Zuko as they both work with the Earth King over a conflict: the Fire Nation colonies in Earth kingdom territory. This issue escalates as Yu Dao, one of the Fire Nation colonies, fights against this order. In The Promise Part Two, Team Avatar begins to try to resolve the Yu Dao issue, while Fire Lord Zuko aims to receive advice from his father who was previously Fire Lord. Zuko experiences an internal war, in which he feels the need to do what is best for the four nations but he fears becoming like his tyrant father. The issue becomes tense as Earth King Kuei and Zuko come closer to war. In The Promise Part Three, tensions escalate between as Zuko and Kuei both aim to keep Yu Dao through military means. As both send their armies to fight, Avatar Aang has to decide what he needs to do to maintain peace between the four nations, even if that means killing Fire Lord Zuko, his best friend.

Critical reception 
In June 2012, The Promise Part Two was a New York Times Bestseller and the top of the BookScan charts.  Critics say that this comic is great at displaying the characters authentically and the illustrations are a "great success."

The Search

Plot 
The Search is about Fire Lord Zuko's adventure to find his presumably deceased mother Ursa who left the Fire Nation in order to save his life when he was a child. This comic also includes a large piece of Ursa's life, her lover and heartbreak. The plot goes from the past, Ursa's life with her lover, and the present, Zuko's quest to find her. In The Search Part One, Zuko makes a deal with his sister Azula: she has to help him find his mother and he releases her from the mental institution. Zuko, Azula and Team Avatar set out to find his mother by going to Hira'a, the town where Ursa grew up. By the end of The Search, Part One, Zuko finds out that his biological father was a man named Ikem that his mother was in love with before marrying Ozai.
 In The Search, Part Two, Avatar Aang dismisses Fire Lord Zuko's enthusiasm upon finding out Ozai is not his biological father and expresses his worry that if Ozai is not Zuko's real father then Zuko has no right to the throne. Team Aang, Zuko and Azula continue searching for Ursa and go to Forgetful Valley. Here, Aang meets "The Mother of Faces" in the spirit world. In The Search, Part Three, Azula finds out important information about Ursa and aims to find her mother herself but Zuko and Sokka try to find Ursa first. Aang and Katara deal with the "Mother of Faces" and her spirit animals.

Critical reception 
In July 2013, The Search Part Two was a New York Times Bestseller. Critics say that this comic explained the missing pieces Zuko's mother well, but the story only expanded the narrative with coincidences rather than purpose.

The Rift

Plot 
The Rift mostly revolves around Aang's roots: the Air Nation. This comic also explores Toph's past, specifically her complicated relationship with her father. In The Rift Part One, Aang wants his friends to celebrate Yangchen's festival. This festival was one of the most sacred Air Nomad holidays but was not celebrated in 100 years due to the Air Nomad genocide. Aang meets with Avatar Yangchen and finds out that a jointly owned Fire Nation and Earth Kingdom factory is on Air Nomad sacred land. Toph reunites with her father, whom she had not seen in two years. In The Rift Part Two, Team Avatar continues to try to save sacred air nomadic land from industrialists. Aang and Avatar Yangchen enter the Spirit World and she speaks about her experience with a man named General Old Iron and his grudge against the city of Boma for the death of Lady Tienhai. As they speak, the place is hit by an Earthquake. In The Rift Part Three, Aang connects with Avatar Yangchen and learns that the only way to prevent the bitter spirit of General Old Iron to return is to destroy the town. Toph does not agree with this solution, as she respects the refinery's symbol of international cooperation between the Fire and Earth nations. Ultimately, Aang fights General Old Iron and wins. After meeting with Lady Tenhai in the Spirit World, Aang recognizes that spirits deserve to live with human civilization in peace and creates the "Spirits Friendship Festival."

Critical reception 
In March 2014, The Rift Part One was a New York Times Bestseller. Critics say that the message of this comic, that tradition should influence the present, but it should not prohibit progress, is a suitable transition to Avatar: Legend of Korra.

Smoke and Shadow

Plot 
Smoke and Shadow continues Zuko's and Ursa's relationship where The Search leaves off. This comic also goes further in depth with Zuko's family in general. This comic mostly revolves around Zuko's and Aang's mission to settle both issues in the physical and spiritual world. In Smoke and Shadow Part One, mysterious figures called the Kemurikage spirits tell a prophecy that Zuko must leave the throne or the Fire Nation will collapse. The New Ozai Society begin to organize a plan to remove Zuko from the throne and children begin to disappear in the Fire Nation Capitol. In Smoke and Shadow Part Two, Aang and the rest of Team Avatar aim to make sense of the disappearances of the children. The leader of the Kemurikage is revealed to Zuko and Aang as Azula. In Smoke and Shadow Part Three, Zuko attempts to catch Azula. In doing so, he fights Azula and she tells him that she wants Zuko to be the Fire Lord she wanted to be- one who leads with fear rather than compassion. In this way, she rules through him. Azula and the rest of the Kemurikage disappear in the smoke. Aang and the rest of Team Avatar save the children by fighting the Kemurikage spirits. After the battle, Zuko gives a speech about his failures, and makes a promise to do right. Azula and two other Kemurikage watch, and when Zuko finishes, they vanish. The ending of the comic consists of Ursa meeting Ozai again in his cell, after all these years. Ursa sees her former husband for the man he was, a small man trying to act big.

Critical reception 
In May 2016, Smoke and Shadow Part Three was a New York Times Bestseller. Critics say that this comic was good at portraying Zuko's family with further character development. However, critics also say that some of the themes, like Zuko's insecurity with being Fire Lord, became repetitive.

North and South

Plot 
North and South revolves around Katara and Sokka's roots: the Southern Water Tribe. In North and South Part One, Katara and Sokka return to their home and are surprised by the flourishing place it has become from the little village where they grew up. They find out that their father, Hakoda, was in charge and Malina, a woman from the Northern Water Tribe, had a huge role in progressing the Southern Water Tribe. By the end of part one, Katara and Sokka walk in on their father and Malina in the middle of a kiss. In North and South Part Two, Southern Gilak tries to kidnap Katara and Sokka and leaves a note on Hakoda's door which says, "Soon you will see the truth Chieftain." Katara is suspicious of the integration of the Northern and Southern Water Tribes. Gilak exposes Milan for her integration of both tribes and claims that she only aims to exploit the natural resources of the Southern Water Tribe for the benefit of the Northern Water Tribe. Milan apologizes but Gilak's troops attack her and her brother Maliq. Team Avatar steps in and fights off the troops. Gilak is escorted to his prison cell, but an officer who says she never liked the Northerners gives him the key to his cell. In North and South Part Three, Fire Lord Zuko and the Earth King Kuei come to the Southern Water tribe and approve of the full integration of the tribes. Amid this, Gilak breaks free and causes a rebellion. They then kidnap Earth King Kuei, threatening that if Hakoda does not give himself up to Southern justice at the Bridge of No Return, Gilak will kill Kuei. It breaks out into a fight; Gilak dies and Malina is saved by Katara. 

Afterwards, Katara goes to her mother's grave and mourns. The ending is when the kids cook food for the grandparents, and they sit in a circle, eating food from all corners of the world.

Critical reception 

Some critics say that North and South was "disappointing" and a "victim of its own making." Other critics say that the antagonist, Gilak, was not nearly as threatening as other villains which made the comic less exciting.

Imbalance

Plot 
Imbalance surrounds the tension between benders and nonbenders at the Earthen Fire Industries. In Imbalance Part One, Team Avatar arrive at the Earthen Fire Industries and to their surprise, they are met with disapproval as there are increased disputes among the benders and the nonbenders. In Imbalance Part Two, Team Avatar aims to solve the conflict between the benders and nonbenders. In Imbalance Part Three, the conflict comes to an all time high and it is up to Aang to come up with a solution to satisfy both parties. This comic as a whole sets up the majority of the plot of Avatar: The Legend of Korra as it explores increasing political tension as well as industrialization.

Critical reception 
Critics say that this comic goes slow in the beginning, as it starts off with a broad dispute among benders and nonbenders, but increases pace as the narrative explores the idea of modernization.

Katara and the Pirate's Silver 
Released on October 13, 2020, Katara and the Pirate's Silver is the first stand alone graphic novel (as compared to previous graphic novels released as trilogies) from the Avatar Universe. Furthermore, unlike previously released graphic trilogies which were set after the events of the show, Katara and the Pirate's Silver is set during the events of the show.

Plot 
Set in the Avatar universe after the events of the Book Two: Earth episode "Bitter Work", Katara and the Pirate's Silver follows Katara as she gets separated from the rest of Team Avatar when while passing through a Fire Nation blockade, Appa accidentally flings Katara from his back in the course of evading Fire Nation launched projectiles. Unable to rendezvous with Aang, Toph, and Sokka, Katara must avoid capture by aligning herself with a band of pirates who offer her passage beyond the blockade. In doing so, Katara is forced to prove that she has the grit and toughness to stand up to anyone.

Critical Reception 
The graphic novel was generally well received by critics. Brenton Stewart of Comic Books Resources said that "after being usually relegated to the sidelines, Katara shines as the story's chief protagonist in a long-overdue starring role that's just one of several smart storytelling decisions." He went on to say, "Attachments to the original series aside, the comic is just an enjoyable and fun adventure showcasing Katara's strength and revealing more of the ever-more fascinating world of Avatar as we gain an insight into the life of pirates".

Toph Beifong's Metalbending Academy

Plot 
Released on February 17, 2021, Toph Beifong's Metalbending Academy is a standalone graphic novel set in the Avatar universe after the events of The Rift and before the events of Smoke and Shadow. The graphic novel follows Toph as she settles into an easy life turning Earthbenders into Metalbenders after building up enough infrastructure for her metalbending academy. However, Toph finds the grind tedious, so her former students Penga, Ho Tun and the Dark One help carry her workload and when Sokka and Suki visit to invite Toph to a concert they hope the change may offer her excitement.

Suki, Alone 
The third standalone and final graphic novel from the Avatar universe, Suki, Alone, was released on July 27, 2021. Originally, it was scheduled to be released on June 22, 2021.

It follows the story of Suki, the Kyoshi Warrior somewhere between "Appa's Lost Days" and "The Boiling Rock".

Azula in the Spirit Temple 
During San Diego Comic-Con 2022, it was revealed that a new comic would be slated for the summer of 2023. Faith Erin Hicks will return to write with art by Peter Wartman. The story will be a standalone story following Azula.

References

External links 
 Dark Horse Comics

Avatar: The Last Airbender
Comics based on television series
Fantasy comics